The Mahāyāna sūtras are a broad genre of Buddhist scriptures (sūtra) that are accepted as canonical and as buddhavacana ("Buddha word") in Mahāyāna Buddhism. They are largely preserved in the Chinese Buddhist canon, the Tibetan Buddhist canon, and in extant Sanskrit manuscripts. Several hundred Mahāyāna sūtras survive in Sanskrit, or in Chinese and Tibetan translations. They are also sometimes called Vaipulya ("extensive") sūtras by earlier sources. The Buddhist scholar Asaṅga classified the Mahāyāna sūtras as part of the Bodhisattvapiṭaka, a collection of texts meant for bodhisattvas.

Modern scholars of Buddhist studies generally hold that these sūtras first began to appear between the 1st century BCE and the 1st century CE. They continued being composed, compiled, and edited until the decline of Buddhism in ancient India. Some of them may have also been composed outside of India, such as in Central Asia and in East Asia.

Mahāyāna Buddhists typically consider several major Mahāyāna sūtras to have been taught by Shakyamuni Buddha, committed to memory and recited by his disciples, in particular Ananda. However, other Mahāyāna sūtras are presented as being taught by other figures, such as bodhisattvas like Mañjuśrī and Avalokiteśvara. There are various reasons that Indian Mahāyāna Buddhists gave to explain the fact that they only appeared at a later time. One such reason was that they had been hidden away in the land of the Nāgas (snake deities, dragons) until the proper time for their dissemination arrived.

The Mahāyāna sūtras were not accepted by all Buddhists in ancient India, and the various Indian Buddhist schools disagreed on their status as "word of the Buddha". They are generally not accepted as the Buddha's word by the school of Theravāda Buddhism.

History and background

Origins and early history
The origins of the Mahāyāna and their sūtras are not completely understood. Modern scholars have proposed numerous theories about the origins of Mahāyāna and the Mahāyāna texts.

Some of the main theories are the following:

 The lay origins theory, first proposed by Jean Przyluski and then defended by Étienne Lamotte and Akira Hirakawa, states that laypersons were particularly important in the development of Mahāyāna and its texts.  This is partly based on some texts like the Vimalakirti Sūtra, which praise lay figures at the expense of monastics. This theory is no longer widely accepted.
 The theory which held that Mahāyāna developed within the Mahāsāṃghika tradition. Drewes notes that there is actually little evidence that Mahāsāṃghika schools had a special connection to the production of Mahāyāna texts, and it seems Mahāyāna arose as a pan-Buddhist phenomenon.
 The "forest hypothesis", which states that Mahāyāna arose mainly among hardcore wilderness ascetics (aranyavasins) who were attempting to imitate the Buddha. This has been defended by Paul Harrison and Jan Nattier. This theory is based on certain sutras like the Ugraparipṛcchā Sūtra and the Mahāyāna Rāṣṭrapālapaṛiprcchā which promote ascetic practice in the wilderness as a superior and elite path. These texts criticize monks who live in cities and denigrate the forest life. However, Drewes notes that only a few early Mahāyāna texts advocate or promote this practice, and other Sūtras outright discourage forest dwelling or say it is unnecessary.
 The cult of the book theory, defended by Gregory Schopen, states that Mahāyāna arose among a number of loosely connected book worshiping groups of monastics, who studied, memorized, copied and revered particular Mahāyāna sūtras. Schopen also argued that these groups mostly rejected stupa worship, or worshiping holy relics.

According to David Drewes, none of these theories have been satisfactorily proven and they lack sufficient evidence. Drewes writes that the most likely origin of Mahāyāna is that it was "primarily a textual movement, focused on the revelation, preaching, and dissemination of Mahāyāna sūtras, that developed within, and never really departed from, traditional Buddhist social and institutional structures." The figures of this movement probably saw themselves as bodhisattvas entrusted with teaching and preserving the Mahāyāna sūtras.

Scholars like Joseph Walser have also noted how Mahāyāna sūtras are heterogeneous and seem to have been composed in different communities with varying ideas. Walser writes that "Mahāyāna was probably never unitary, but differed from region to region.". Likewise, Hajime Nakamura states:Unlike the various recensions of the Hīnayāna canon, which were virtually closed by the early centuries of the common era and which shared, at least ideally, a common structure . . . the Mahāyāna scriptures were composed in a variety of disparate social and religious environments over the course of several centuries, diverge widely from each other in content and outlook, and were in many cases meant to stand as individual works representing (it has been conjectured) rivals to the entire Hīnayāna corpus.There is also no evidence that Mahāyāna ever referred to a separate formal school or sect of Buddhism, but rather that it existed within the early Buddhist schools as a certain set of ideals, texts and later doctrines, for bodhisattvas. Mahāyānists also never had a separate Vinaya (monastic rule) from the early Buddhist schools. The Chinese monk Yijing who visited India in the seventh century, writes about how Mahāyāna monastics and non-Mahāyāna monastics lived together under the same Vinaya. The only difference among them was that Mahāyāna monks venerated the bodhisattvas and read the Mahāyāna sūtras.

Some scholars like Richard Gombrich think that Mahāyāna Sūtras only arose after the practice of writing down religious texts became widespread in India and thus that they were always written documents. However, James Apple and David Drewes have drawn attention to these oral features of the early Mahāyāna texts, which were not written documents but orally preserved teachings. Drewes writes, that Mahāyāna sūtras advocate mnemic/oral/aural practices more frequently than they do written ones, make reference to people who have memorized or are in the process of memorizing them, and consistently attach higher prestige to mnemic/oral practices than to ones involving written texts. Study of differences in various versions of sutras translated into Chinese has directly shown that these texts were often transmitted orally.  Mahāyāna sūtras were committed to memory and recited by important learned monks called "Dharma reciters" (dharmabhāṇakas), who were viewed as the substitute for the actual speaking presence of the Buddha.

Much of the early extant evidence for the origins of Mahāyāna comes from early Chinese translations of Mahāyāna texts. These Mahāyāna teachings were first propagated into China by Lokakṣema, the first translator of Mahāyāna Sūtras into Chinese during the second century.

The Mahāyāna movement remained quite small until the fifth century, with very few manuscripts having been found before then (the exceptions are from Bamiyan). According to Joseph Walser, the fifth and sixth centuries saw a great increase in their production. By this time, Chinese pilgrims, such as Faxian, Yijing, and Xuanzang were traveling to India, and their writings describe monasteries which they label 'Mahāyāna' as well as monasteries where both Mahāyāna monks and non-Mahāyāna monks lived together.

Modern scholarly views on dating
Dating the Mahāyāna sūtras is quite difficult; and many can only be dated firmly to when they were translated into another language.

Andrew Skilton summarizes a common prevailing view of the Mahāyāna sūtras among modern Buddhist studies scholars as follows:

A. K. Warder notes that the Mahāyāna Sūtras are highly unlikely to have come from the teachings of the historical Buddha, since the language and style of every extant Mahāyāna Sūtra is comparable more to later Indian texts than to texts that could have circulated in the Buddha's putative lifetime. Warder also notes that the Tibetan historian Tāranātha (1575–1634) proclaimed that after the Buddha taught the sutras, they disappeared from the human world and circulated only in the world of the nagas. In Warder's view, "this is as good as an admission that no such texts existed until the 2nd century A.D."

Paul Williams writes that while Mahāyāna tradition believes that the Mahāyāna sūtras were taught by the Buddha, "source-critical and historical awareness has made it impossible for the modern scholar to accept this traditional account." However, Williams further writes thatNevertheless, it is not always absurd to suggest that a Mahāyāna sūtra or teaching may contain elements of a tradition which goes back to the Buddha himself, which was played down or just possibly excluded from the canonical formulations of the early schools. We have seen that even at the First Council there is evidence of disagreement as regards the details of the Buddha's teaching.John W. Pettit writes that "Mahāyāna has not got a strong historical claim for representing the explicit teachings of the historical Buddha". However, he also argues that basic Mahāyāna concepts such as "the bodhisattva ethic, emptiness (sunyata), and the recognition of a distinction between buddhahood and arhatship as spiritual ideals," can be seen in the Pāli Canon. According to Pettit, this suggests that Mahāyāna is "not simply an accretion of fabricated doctrines" but "has a strong connection with the teachings of Buddha himself".

Questions of authenticity 

Mahāyāna sūtras are generally regarded by Mahāyānists as being more profound than the śrāvaka texts as well as generating more spiritual merit and benefit. Thus, they are seen as superior and more virtuous to non-Mahāyāna sūtras.

The study of Mahāyāna sūtras is central to East Asian Buddhism, where they are widely read and studied. In Tibetan Buddhism meanwhile, there is a greater emphasis on the study of Mahāyāna śāstras (philosophical treatises), which are seen as more systematic ways of studying the content found in the sūtras.

The Mahāyāna sūtras were not recognized as being Buddha word (buddhavacana) by various groups of Indian Buddhists and there was lively debate over their authenticity throughout the Buddhist world. Buddhist communities such as the Mahāsāṃghika school and the Theravada tradition of Sri Lanka became divided into groups which accepted or did not accept these texts. Theravāda commentaries of the Mahavihara sub-school mention these texts (which they call Vedalla/Vetulla) as not being the Buddha word and being counterfeit scriptures. The Saṃmitīya school was also known as being strongly opposed to the Mahayana sutras as noted by the Tibetan historian Tāranātha. Xuanzang reports that a Saṃmitīya known as Prajñāgupta composed a treatise which argued against the Mahāyāna. 

Various Mahāyāna sūtras warn against the charge that they are not word of the Buddha and defend their authenticity in different ways. Some Mahāyāna sūtras like as the Gaṇḍavyūha often criticize early Buddhist figures, such as Sariputra for lacking knowledge and goodness, and thus, these elders or śrāvaka are seen as not intelligent enough to receive the Mahāyāna teachings.

The reason these accounts give for the historically late disclosure of the Mahāyāna teachings is that most people were initially unable to understand the Mahāyāna sūtras at the time of the Buddha (500 BCE) and suitable recipients for these teachings had not yet arisen. Some traditional accounts of the transmission of the Prajñāpāramitā sūtras claim that they were originally stored or hidden in the realm of the nāgas (serpent-like supernatural beings). Later, these sūtras were retrieved by Nāgārjuna. Other Mahāyāna sources state that they were preached or preserved by bodhisattvas like Mañjuśrī or Buddhas like Vajradhāra.

Another Mahāyāna explanation for the later appearance of the Mahāyāna sūtras in the historical record is the idea that they are the revelations of certain Buddhas and bodhisattvas, transmitted through visions and meditative experiences to a select few individuals. The practice of visualization of Buddhas (in texts like the Sukhāvatīvyūha) has been seen by some scholars as a possible explanation for the source of certain Mahāyāna sūtras which were seen as revelations from Buddha in other heavenly worlds. Williams also notes that there are other Mahāyāna texts which speak of sūtras being revealed or entrusted to forest dwelling monks by devas (deities). Paul Harrison notes that the idea that devas may preach the Buddha word is also present in non-Mahāyāna texts. Paul Harrison has also noted the importance of dream revelations in certain texts such as the Arya-svapna-nirdesa which lists and interprets 108 dream signs.

"Word of the Buddha" as what leads to awakening 
A different Mahāyāna justification for the authenticity of the Mahāyāna sūtras is that they are in accord with the truth, with the Buddha's Dharma and therefore they lead to awakening. This is based on the idea that "Whatever is well spoken [subhasita], all that is the word of the Buddha [buddhabhasita]." As such, this idea holds that Mahāyāna is the "word of the Buddha" because it leads to awakening (bodhi), not because it was spoken by a specific individual with the title "Buddha". According to Venerable Hsuan Hua, there are five types of beings who may speak "Buddha word": a Buddha, a disciple of a Buddha, a deva (heavenly being), a ṛṣi (a sage), or an emanation of one of these beings; however, they must first receive certification from a Buddha that its contents are true Dharma.

The Indian Mahāyāna scholar Shantideva (8th century) states:Through four factors is an inspired utterance [pratibhana] the word of the Buddhas. What four? (i)...the inspired utterance is connected with truth, not untruth; (ii) it is connected with the Dharma, not that which is not the Dharma; (iii) it brings about the renunciation of moral taints [klesa] not their increase; and (iv) it shows the laudable qualities of nirvana, not those of the cycle of rebirth [samsara].Williams writes that similar ideas can be found in the Pali Canon, though it is interpreted in a more open ended way in the Mahāyāna in order to include a larger set of teachings that were seen as spiritually useful.

The modern Japanese Zen Buddhist scholar D. T. Suzuki similarly argued that while the Mahāyāna sūtras may not have been directly taught by the historical Buddha, the "spirit and central ideas" of Mahāyāna "are those of its founder". Thus, Suzuki admits (and celebrates) how the Mahāyāna evolved and adapted itself to suit the times by developing new teachings and texts, while at the same time maintaining the core "spirit" of the Buddha.

Teachings

New ideas 
The teachings as contained in the Mahāyāna sūtras as a whole have been described as a loosely bound bundle of many teachings, which was able to contain the various contradictions. Because of these contradictory elements, there are "very few things that can be said with certainty about Mahāyāna Buddhism".

Central to the Mahāyāna sūtras is the ideal of the Bodhisattva path, something which is not unique to them, however, as such a path is also taught in non-Mahayana texts which also required prediction of future Buddhahood in the presence of a living Buddha. What is unique to Mahāyāna sūtras is the idea that the term bodhisattva is applicable to any person from the moment they intend to become a Buddha (i.e. the arising of bodhicitta) and without the requirement of a living Buddha. They also claim that any person who accepts and uses Mahāyāna sūtras either had already received or will soon receive such a prediction from a Buddha, establishing their position as an irreversible bodhisattva. Some Mahāyāna sūtras promote it as a universal path for everyone, while others like the Ugraparipṛcchā see it as something for a small elite of hardcore ascetics.

While some Mahāyāna sūtras like the Vimalakirti sūtra and the White Lotus sūtra criticize arhats and sravakas (referring to non-Mahāyānists) as lacking wisdom, and reject their path as a lower vehicle, i.e. 'hīnayāna' (the 'inferior way'), earlier Mahāyāna sūtras do not do this. As noted by David Drewes "early Mahāyāna sūtras often present their teachings as useful not only to people who wish to become Buddhas, but to those who wish to attain arhatship or pratyekabuddhahood as well. The old idea that the Mahāyāna began with the rejection of the arhat ideal in favor of that of the bodhisattva is thus clearly incorrect." Paul Williams also writes that earlier Mahāyāna sūtras like the Ugraparipṛcchā Sūtra and the Ajitasena sutra do not present any antagonism towards the hearers or the ideal of arhatship like later sutras.

According to David Drewes, Mahāyāna sūtras contain several elements besides the promotion of the bodhisattva ideal, including "expanded cosmologies and mythical histories, ideas of purelands and great, 'celestial' Buddhas and bodhisattvas, descriptions of powerful new religious practices, new ideas on the nature of the Buddha, and a range of new philosophical perspectives."

Several Mahāyāna sūtras depict Buddhas or Bodhisattvas not found in earlier texts, such as the Buddhas Amitabha, Akshobhya and Vairocana, and the bodhisattvas Maitreya, Mañjusri, Ksitigarbha, and Avalokiteshvara. An important feature of Mahāyāna is the way that it understands the nature of Buddhahood. Mahāyāna texts see Buddhas (and to a lesser extent, certain bodhisattvas as well) as transcendental or supramundane (lokuttara) beings, who live for eons constantly helping others through their activity.

According to Paul Williams, in Mahāyāna, a Buddha is often seen as "a spiritual king, relating to and caring for the world", rather than simply a teacher who after his death "has completely 'gone beyond' the world and its cares". Buddha Sakyamuni's life and death on earth is then usually understood docetically, as a "mere appearance", his death was an unreal show (which was done in order to teach others), while in reality he continues to live in a transcendent realm in order to help all beings.

Practices 

Mahāyāna sūtras, especially those of the Prajñāpāramitā genre, teach the importance of the practice of the six perfections (pāramitā) as part of the path to Buddhahood, and special attention is given to the perfection of wisdom (prajñāpāramitā) which is seen as primary. The importance of developing bodhicitta, which refers to a mind that is aimed at full awakening (i.e. Buddhahood) is also stressed.

Another central practice advocated by the Mahāyāna sūtras is focused around "the acquisition of merit, the universal currency of the Buddhist world, a vast quantity of which was believed to be necessary for the attainment of Buddhahood".

According to David Drewes, Mahāyāna sūtras include new religious practices that are supposed to make Buddhahood easy to achieve. Some of the most widely taught practices taught in Mahāyāna sūtras include:

 hearing the names of certain Buddhas or bodhisattvas, or reciting their name
 maintaining Buddhist precepts,
 listening to, memorizing, reciting, preaching, worshiping and copying Mahāyāna sūtras,
 rejoicing (anumodana) in the collected meritorious actions of all previous Buddhas and other beings.

Another innovative "shortcut" to Buddhahood in Mahāyāna sutras are what are often called Pure Land practices. These involve the invocation of Buddhas such as Amitabha and Aksobhya, who are said to have created "Buddha fields" or "pure lands" especially so that those beings who wish to be reborn there can easily and quickly become Buddhas. Reciting the Mahāyāna sūtras and also simply the names of these Buddhas can allow one to be reborn in these places.

Mahāyāna Sūtra Collections 
Some Buddhist Schools in India had collections of Mahāyāna Sūtras which were part of their scriptural canon, sometimes in their own textual collection referred to as Bodhisattva Piṭaka. Jan Nattier notes that the Ugraparipṛcchā Sūtra mentions a Bodhisattva Piṭaka (as part of a four part canon that also includes the Sutra Piṭaka, the Vinaya Piṭaka, and the Abhidharma Piṭaka). According to Nattier, schools which maintained a Bodhisattva Piṭaka include the Dharmaguptaka and perhaps the Bahuśrutīya (or whoever authored the Tattvasiddhi-Śāstra). Some sutras translated by Lokaksema (c. 147-189 CE) also mention a "Bodhisattva Piṭaka".

In the 4th century Mahāyāna abhidharma work Abhidharmasamuccaya, Asaṅga refers to the collection which contains the āgamas as the Śrāvakapiṭaka, and associates it with the śrāvakas and pratyekabuddhas. Asaṅga classifies the Mahāyāna Sūtras as belonging to the Bodhisattvapiṭaka, which is designated as the collection of teachings for bodhisattvas.

The Mahāyāna Sūtras survive predominantly in "Buddhist Chinese" (fójiào hànyǔ 佛教漢語, a variety of written ancient Chinese) and Classical Tibetan translations. The source texts were probably in Buddhist Hybrid Sanskrit or various Prakrit languages such as Gandhari. The main collections are found in the Tibetan Kangyur and the Chinese Tripiṭaka. There are also numerous Sanskrit manuscripts of individual texts from various finds like Dunhuang, and Sanskrit collections from Nepal. Many parallel translations of certain Sūtras exist. A handful of them, such as the Prajñāpāramitā sutras like the Heart Sutra and the Diamond Sutra, are considered fundamental by most modern Mahāyāna traditions.

The earliest group of Mahāyāna Sūtras translated into Chinese 
Some scholars have traditionally considered the earliest Mahāyāna Sūtras to include the very first versions of the Prajñāpāramitā series, along with texts concerning Akshobhya, which were probably composed in the 1st century BCE in the south of India. According to A.K. Warder, some scholars think that the earliest Mahāyāna Sūtras were mainly composed in the south of India, and later the activity of writing additional scriptures was continued in the north.

Some of the earliest Mahāyāna Sūtras were translated by the Kushan monk Lokakṣema, who came to China from the kingdom of Gandhāra. His first translations to Chinese were made in the Eastern Han capital of Luoyang between 178 and 189 CE. The editors of the Taishō Tripiṭaka attribute twelve texts to Lokakṣema. These attributions have been studied in detail by Erik Zürcher, Paul Harrison and Jan Nattier, and some have been called into question. Zürcher considers it reasonably certain that Lokakṣema translated the following:

 T224. Aṣṭasāhasrikā Prajñāpāramitā Sūtra ("The Perfection of Wisdom in Eight Thousand Lines"; 道行般若經)
 T280. The Scripture on the Tusita Heaven (佛說兜沙經.), part of the proto-Avatamsaka Sutra
 T313. Akṣobhya-vyūha (阿閦佛國經)
 T350. Kaśyapa-parivarta ("The Kāśyapa Chapter"; 說遺日摩尼寶經)
 T418. Pratyutpanna Samādhi Sūtra  (般舟三昧經)
 T458. Mañjuśrī's Inquiry Concerning the Bodhisattva Career (文殊師利問菩薩署經)
 T626. Ajātaśatru Kaukṛtya Vinodana Sūtra (阿闍世王經)
 T807. The Hundred Jewels of the Inner Treasury (佛說內藏百寶經)

Harrison is doubtful about T626, and considers that T418 is the product of revision and does not date from Lokakṣema's time. Conversely, Harrison considers that T624 Druma-kinnara-rāja-paripṛcchā-sūtra (伅真陀羅所問如來三昧經) ought to be considered genuine.

Kumārajīva translations 
Another set of Mahayana sutras, which gives an indication of which Mahayana sources were widespread in Central Asia, are those translated by the Indian-Kuchan translator Kumārajīva (344–413 CE) and his team (probably from Kuchan target sources) in Chang'an. The main sutras they translated are:

 Vajracchedikā Prajñāpāramitā Sūtra (Diamond Sutra)
 Smaller Sukhāvatī-vyūha (T 366)
 Saddharma Puṇḍarīka Sūtra (Lotus Sutra) (T 263—62)
 Vimalakirti Nirdesa Sutra (T 475)
 Aṣṭasāhasrikā Prajñāpāramitā Sūtra,  (T 227, 408 CE)
 Pañcaviṃśatisāhasrikā Prajñāpāramitā Sūtra (T 223, 403-404 CE)
 Śūraṅgama Samādhi Sūtra (T 642)
 Daśabhūmikā Sūtra (T 286) in collaboration with Buddhayaśas.
 Acintyaprabhāsa-nirdeśa-sūtra (T 484)
 Viśeṣacintā-brahma-paripṛcchā (T 585—86)
 Bhadrakalpa (T 425)
 Vasudhara-sūtra (T 481—82)
 Pūrṇa-paripṛcchā ( T 310, 17)
 Ratnajāli-paripṛcchā (T 433)
 Vidhi-hṛdaya-vyūha (T 307)
 Sarva-puṇya-samuccaya-samādhi-sūtra (T 381—82)

The Sūtrasamuccaya 
The Sūtrasamuccaya is a compendium of sūtra quotations which survives in Tibetan and Chinese translation. It is sometimes attributed to Nagarjuna, but is likely to be from a later period (possibly 4th century CE or later). This anthology gives us an idea of some of the important Mahāyāna Sūtras that were being studied and quoted in Indian Mahāyāna Buddhism at this time. The Sūtrasamuccaya quotes from some early Buddhist texts, but mainly focuses on Mahāyāna Sūtras.

The following Mahāyāna Sūtras are quoted in the Sūtrasamuccaya:

 Saddharmapundarika-sutra (Lotus Sutra)
 Nirnaya-raja-sutra
 Bodhisattva-pitaka
 Bhagavajjnana-vaipulya-sutra
 Candra-garbha-parivarta
 Gandavyuha-sutra
 Bhadrakalpika-sutra
 Tathagata-guhya-sutra
 Vimatisamudghata-sutra 
 Sraddha-bala-dhana-sutra
 Sagara-naga-raja-pariprccha
 Tathagataguna-jñanacintyavis-ayavatara-nirdesa-sutra
 Astasahasrika Prajñaparamita
 Astadasasahasrika Prajñaparamita
 Pancavimsatisahasrika Prajñaparamita
 Simhasutejo'vadana
 Prasenajit-pariprccha
 Prasanta-viniscaya-pratiharya-sutra
 Ajatasatru-parivarta
 Ratnarasi-sutra
 Kasyapaparivarta
 Pitaputrasamagamana-sutra

 Dharmasamgiti-sutra
 Aksayamati-nirdesa-sutra
 Upayakausalya-sutra
 Viradattagrhapati-pariprcchda
 Ratnamegha-sutra 
 Dharani-svararaja-pariprccha
 Maitreya-simhanada-sutra
 Mañjusri-vikridita-sutra
 Candrapradipa (=Samadhiraja, Candraprabhaparivarta) sutra
 Niyataniyatavataramudrasutra
 Mañjusri-vikurvana-parivarta
 Sagaramati-pariprccha-sutra
 Ugra-pariprccha-sutra
 Pravrajyantaraya-sutra
 Udayanavatsaraja-pariprccha
 Saddharma-smrtyupasthana-sutra
 Vimalakirti-nirdesa
 Satyaka-parivarta
 Vicikitsasudhvamsa-sutra (possibly identical to Vimatisamudghata-sutra)
 Suryagarbha-parivarta
 Akasagarbha-parivarta

 Ksitigarbha-sutra
 Adhyasayasamcodana-sutra
 Brahma-pariprccha
 Puspakuta-sutra
 Mahakaruna-(pundarika)-sutra
 Tathagata-bimba-parivarta
 Anupurva-samudgata-sutra
 Tathagatotpattisambhava-sutra
 Lokottara-parivarta
 Lankavatara-sutra
 Mahasamnipata-parivarta
 Avaivartacakra-sutra
 Srimalasimhanada-sutra
 Bhadramayakara-sutra
 Buddhavatamsaka-sutra
 Brahma-visesacinti-pariprccha
 Saptasatika Prajñaparamita
 Ratnasamnicaya-nirdesa-sutra
 Trisatika Prajñaparamita
 Ratnadattamanava-sutra 
 Tathagata-kosa-sutra
 Maradamana-parivarta
 Dasabhumika-sutra

Madhyamaka school 
According to David Seyfort Ruegg, the main sutra sources of the madhyamaka tradition are the Prajñāpāramitā, Ratnakūṭa and Avataṃsaka sutras. Other sutras which were widely cited by Indian madhamika philosophers are: Vimalakīrtinirdeṣa, the Śuraṃgamasamādhi, the Saddharmapuṇḍarīka, the Daśabhūmika, the Akṣayamatinirdeśa, the Tathāgataguhyaka, and the Kāśyapaparivarta.

Ruegg also notes that the later madhyamaka Candrakīrti (c. 600 – c. 650) cites the Prajñāpāramitā sutras as well as: the Akṣayamatinirdeśa, Anavataptahradāpasaṃkramaṇa, Upāliparipṛcchā, Kāśyapaparivarta, Gaganagañja, Tathāgataguhya, Daśabhūmika, Dṛḍhādhyāśaya, Dhāraṇīśvararāja, Pitāputrasamāgama, Mañjuśrīparipṛcchā, Ratnakūṭa, Ratnacūḍaparipṛcchā, Ratnamegha, Ratnākara, Laṅkāvatāra, Lalitavistara, Vimalakirtinirdesa, Śālistamba, Satyadvayāvatāra, Saddharmapuṇḍarīka, Samādhirāja (Candrapradīpa), and Hastikakṣya.
The Compendium of Training (Śikṣāsamuccaya) by the eighth-century madhyamaka scholar Śāntideva, cites a total of ninety-seven Mahāyāna sūtras, some of which are now lost. According to Donald Lopez:Śāntideva cites three passages from the Lotus Sūtra, compared, for example, with two from the Aṣṭasāhasrikāprajñāpāramitā and two from the Laṅkāvatārasūtra. Among the most cited sūtras are the Akṣayamatinirdeśa (eighteen citations), the Ugraparipṛcchā (twenty citations), the Dharmasaṃgīti (eighteen citations), and the Ratnamegha (twenty-four citations).

In the Chinese canon

Though there are various editions of the Chinese Buddhist canon (大藏經; pinyin: Dàzàngjīng), one of the most widespread modern editions is the Japanese Taisho Tripitaka, redacted during the 1920s. It consists of eighty-five volumes.

The Mahāyāna Sūtras are contained in various sections of the canon:

 Prajñapāramitā Section
 Saddharma Puṇḍarīka Section
 Avataṃsaka Section
 Ratnakūṭa Section 
 Mahāparinirvāṇa Section
 Mahāsannipāta Section
 Sutra Collection Section

In the Tibetan Canon 
In the Tibetan Buddhist Canon, Mahāyāna Sūtra translations are found in the Kangyur (Wylie: bka'-'gyur). They are traditionally divided into four divisions:

 Prajñāpāramitā (sher phyin), 23 Sūtras.
 Buddhāvataṃsaka (phal chen), a single long text which is actually a composite work.
 Ratnakūta (dkon brtsegs), 49 Sūtras.
 General Sūtra collection (mdo sde), 266 sūtras, varied in length, subject, interlocutors and origins. Most are Mahāyāna works, but a few are non-Mahāyāna texts.

Newar Buddhism 
Newar Buddhism has a group of nine Sanskrit Mahayana sutras that are considered the key texts of the tradition. They are:

 Aṣṭasāhasrikā Prajñāpāramitā Sūtra
 Saddharma Puṇḍarīka Sūtra
 Suvarṇaprabhāsa Sūtra
 Samādhirāja Sūtra
 Gandavyūha Sūtra
 Laṅkāvatāra Sūtra
 Daśabhūmika Sūtra
 Lalitavistara Sūtra
 Tathāgataguhya Sūtra (actually replaced by the Guhyasamaja since the tradition lost the Tathāgataguhya)

Key Mahāyāna Sūtras

Proto-Mahayana sutras
The Ajitasena Sūtra has been called "Proto-Mahāyāna" by Paul Williams. While it promotes Buddhahood for all, the text lacks the usual antagonism towards the śravakas and arhats, as is typical of later Mahāyāna texts like the Vimalakīrti-nirdeśa Sūtra. It also lacks any self-awareness of itself as being part of "Mahāyāna." It promotes giving to monks like any non-Mahāyāna text, but also includes the depiction of a prince who has visions of many Buddhafields (including Sukhavati and Abhirati) on becoming an arhat.

The Salistamba Sūtra (rice stalk or rice sapling sūtra) has been considered one of the first Mahayana sutras. According to N. Ross Reat, this sutra has many parallels with the material in the Pali suttas (especially the Mahatanha-sahkhaya sutta, M1:256-71), and could date as far back as 200 BCE. It is possible that this sutra represents a period of Buddhist literature before Mahāyāna doctrine had diverged significantly from the doctrines of the early Buddhist texts.

Prajñāpāramitā Sūtras 

Some of the Prajñāpāramitā Sūtras are considered to be some of the earliest Mahāyāna Sūtras. Various Western scholars generally hold that the Aṣṭasāhasrikā Prajñāpāramitā Sūtra is one of the earliest of these texts (c. 1st century BCE). The Vajracchedikā Prajñāpāramitā Sūtra is also seen by scholars like Schopen and numerous Japanese scholars as being very early.

Paul Williams also notes that in Lewis Lancaster's analysis of the earliest Chinese versions of the Aṣṭasāhasrikā Prajñāpāramitā Sūtra "a number of key Mahayana concepts are missing from the earliest versions although present in later versions. The world of the earliest Aṣṭasāhasrika is reasonably close to that of the pre-Mahayana traditions."

The main topics of these Sūtras are the path of the bodhisattva, the six transcendent virtues and, in particular, transcendent wisdom (prajñāpāramitā) the most important of these. The bodhisattva "mahasattva" (great being) is a being who is training towards full Buddhahood for the benefit of all. "Transcendent Wisdom" (also: the "Perfection of Wisdom") meanwhile, means the ability to see reality as it truly is, a deep and liberating spiritual knowledge that is the source of all virtues. Prajñāpāramitā is thus "a state of consciousness which understands emptiness (shunyata), the absence of 'self' or intrinsic nature even in dharmas." Since all phenomena (even Nirvana) lack any essence, unchanging core or independence, they are merely conceptual constructs and as such, they are like magical illusions (maya).

Many of these sutras are known by the number of lines, or ślokas, that they contain, such as the Pañcaviṃśatisāhasrikā (25,000 line) PP Sūtra, the Aṣṭadaśasāhasrikā (18,000 lines), and the Śatasāhasrikā (100,000 lines) etc.

The White Lotus Sūtra 

The Saddharma-pundarīka-sūtra (True Dharma White Lotus Sūtra) is a very influential Sūtra, especially in East Asian Buddhism, where it is considered the supreme Sūtra by many East Asian Buddhists (especially in the Tiantai and Nichiren schools).

Probably written down between 100 BCE –150 CE, the Lotus Sūtra states that the three yānas (śrāvakayāna, pratyekabuddhayāna and bodhisattvayāna) are not real paths leading to different goals, there is in fact only one path (ekayāna), with one goal - Buddhahood. The sutra predicts that all those who hear the Dharma will eventually achieve this goal. The earlier teachings are said to be skilful means to teach beings according to their capacities.

The sutra is notable for the idea that a Buddha is not inaccessible after his parinirvāṇa since a Buddha's life-span is incalculably long. Instead of passing into a totally transcendent state, a Buddha remains to help all sentient beings in countless ways, like a great spiritual father that has been around for eons and will continue to teach for many more eons to come.

In some East Asian traditions, the Lotus Sūtra has been compiled together with two other sutras which serve as a prologue and epilogue, respectively the Innumerable Meanings Sutra and the Samantabhadra Meditation Sutra. This composite sutra is often called the Threefold Lotus Sūtra or Three-Part Dharma Flower Sutra.

Sūtras devoted to particular figures 

A large number of Sūtras focus on the nature, teachings and virtues of a particular Buddha or bodhisattva. Some of them also include teachings on how to enter the "buddha-field" (buddhakṣetra, a.k.a. pure land) of a particular Buddha.

These Sūtras include:

 Sūtras which focus on Amitābha Buddha and his buddha-field of Sukhavati, mainly the  Long Sukhāvatīvyūha, and the Short Sukhāvatīvyūha. These texts are very influential in East Asia, particularly in Pure Land Buddhism, which focuses on the salvific power of faith in Amitābha's power to transport all beings to his pure land. In addition to these, many other texts also feature Amitābha Buddha, and a total of 290 such works have been identified in the Taishō Tripiṭaka.
 The Akṣobhya-tathāgata-syavyūha Sūtra, which focuses on the Buddha Akṣobhya and his pure land of Abhirati, and is one of the oldest "Pure land" texts.
 Sūtras which focus on the bodhisattva Mañjuśrī and his teachings, such as the Mañjuśrī-buddhakṣetra-guṇavyūha (Array of Mañjushri's Buddhaland).
 The Kṣitigarbhasūtra, which focuses on the bodhisattva Kṣitigarbha.
 Sūtras which focus on the bodhisattva Ākāśagarbha.
 Sūtras which focus on Maitreya, such as the Maitreyavyakarana (Maitreya Prophecy) and The Sutra That Expounds the Descent of Maitreya Buddha (Taisho 454). 
 The Bhaiṣajya-guru-vaiḍūrya-prabhā-rāja Sūtra, which focuses on Bhaiṣajyaguru, a healing Buddha also known as the "Medicine Buddha".
The Samantabhadra Meditation Sūtra

Some sutras, such as the Bhadra-kalpika Sutra, give a list of numerous Buddhas.

Meditation focused Sūtras 
Amongst the earliest Mahāyāna texts, the Samādhi Sūtras are a small group of sutras that focus on the attainment of profound states of consciousness reached in meditation, perhaps suggesting that meditation played an important role in the development of early Mahāyāna. These include the Pratyutpanna-sūtra, Samādhirāja-sūtra, and the Śūraṅgama-samādhi-sūtra. 

There is also another genre of Mahāyāna meditation texts called Visualization Sutras (Chinese: 觀經, guan jing).

There are also some meditation focused texts called Dhyāna Sūtras (禪経) translated by figures like Kumarajiva. Some of these Sūtras contain Mahāyāna meditation teachings.

Yogācāra Sūtras 

These sutras primarily teach the doctrine of vijñapti-mātra (ideas-only, impressions-only etc.), associated with the Yogācāra school, which states that there can only ever be awareness of mental images or impressions which manifest themselves as external objects, but are not actually external to the mind. There are many modern interpretations of this doctrine, some which are idealistic, and some which reject the idealist interpretations in favor of phenomenology or representationalism.

The Ārya-saṃdhi-nirmocana-Sūtra (Noble sūtra of the Explanation of the Profound Secrets, c. 2nd century CE) is the earliest surviving sutra in this class, and its the main text. It divides the teachings of the Buddha into three types, which it calls the "three turnings of the wheel of Dharma." To the first turning, it ascribes the Āgamas of the śravakas, to the second turning the lower Mahāyāna sutras including the Prajñāpāramitā sutras, and finally sutras like itself are deemed to comprise the third turning. Moreover, the first two turnings are considered to be provisional (neyārtha) in this system of classification, while the third group is said to present the final truth without a need for further explication (nītārtha).

The well-known Laṅkāvatāra Sūtra, composed sometime around the 4th century CE, is sometimes included in this group, although it is somewhat syncretic in nature, combining Yogācāra doctrines with those of the tathāgatagarbha texts. The Laṅkāvatāra Sūtra was influential in Chan Buddhism.

The Vimalakirtinirdeśa 

In the Vimalakirtinirdeśa, composed some time between the first and second century CE, the bodhisattva Vimalakīrti appears as a layman to teach the Dharma. This is seen by some as a strong assertion of the value of lay practice. The sutra teaches, among other subjects, the meaning of non-dualism, the doctrine of the true body of the Buddha, the characteristically Mahāyāna claim that the appearances of the world are mere illusions, and the superiority of the Mahāyāna over other paths. It places in the mouth of the lay practitioner Vimalakīrti a teaching addressed to both arhats and bodhisattvas, regarding the doctrine of śūnyatā. In most versions, the discourse of the text culminates with a wordless teaching of silence. This sutra has been very popular in China and Japan.

Tathāgatagarbha and Buddha-nature Sūtras 
The class of texts called "Tathāgatagarbha sūtras" teach the important Mahāyāna doctrine of Tathāgatagarbha, (Tathāgata-embryo, Tathāgata-womb, Inner Tathāgata, also known as Sugatagarbha) and Buddha-dhatu (Buddha nature, Buddha source, Buddha element). According to Williams, this doctrine states that all beings "have a Tathāgata [i.e. a Buddha] within them, in seed or embryo, that sentient beings are the wombs or matrices of the Tathāgata, or that they have a Tathāgata as their essence, core, or essential inner nature."

Possibly the earliest of these is the Tathāgatagarbha Sūtra. Other texts in this genre include the Śrīmālā Sūtra, the Aṅgulimālīya Sūtra, the Anunatva-Apurnatva-Nirdesa, the Mahābherī Sūtra and the Mahāyāna Mahāparinirvāṇa Sūtra (not to be confused with the Pāli Mahaparinibbana Sutta and its parallels).

Buddhāvataṃsaka Sūtra 

There are also "sūtras" which are actually collections of other sutras that circulate as one "sutra". One quite influential Sūtra collection is the Buddhāvataṃsaka Sūtra (The Buddha Wreath Sūtra), a large composite text consisting of several Sūtras, some of which circulated separately as independent Sūtras. These include the Daśabhūmika Sūtra and the Gaṇḍavyūha Sūtra. The Buddhāvataṃsaka probably reached its current form by about the 4th century CE and this compilation may have happened in Central Asia.

Williams notes that the Buddhāvataṃsaka sutra includes both the yogacara mind-only teaching and the emptiness doctrine, but does so mainly from the perspective of highly advanced beings who have spiritually realized these teachings through deep meditative absoprtion, and thus have all sorts of magical powers which they use to help others. The Buddhāvataṃsaka is therefore a text that depicts various mystical visionary scenes, with countless world systems and countless Buddhas and bodhisattvas who travel freely throughout this multiverse helping all beings out of compassion. One of the most important Buddhas in this text is Mahāvairocana ("Great Illuminator"), who fills the entire cosmos with his light, his omniscient awareness and his magical emanations (one of which was Shakyamuni Buddha). In China, the Buddhāvataṃsaka became the central text for the Huayen (Jp. Kegon) school of Buddhism, which later went on to influence Chinese Chan Buddhism and Pure Land Buddhism.

Mahāratnakūṭa Sūtra and Mahāsamnipāta Sūtra 
Two other important Mahāyāna "sūtras" which are also collections of smaller independent sūtras are the Mahāratnakūṭa Sūtra (The Heap of Jewels Sūtra) which contains 49 individual sūtras, and the Mahāsamnipāta Sūtra (Sūtra of the Great Assembly) which is a collection of 17 sūtras. Important sutras in the Mahāratnakūṭa include the Bodhisattvapiṭaka, the Śrīmālādevī Siṃhanāda Sūtra, the Longer Sukhāvatī-vyūha Sutra, the Akṣobhya-vyūha, Ugraparipṛcchā Sūtra (The inquiry of Ugra), the Saptaśatikā (700 Line) Prajñāpāramitā Sūtra, and the Tathāgataguhya Sūtra (The Secrets of the Tathāgata). 

Important sutras in the Mahāsamnipāta include larger works like the Akṣayamati-nirdeśa, and the Gaganagañja-paripṛcchā, which themselves also circulated as independent sutras.

Ethical Discipline Sūtras 
These focus on principles that guide the ethical behaviour (Śīla) of bodhisattvas and the bodhisattva precepts, and include the Kāshyapa-parivarta, the Bodhisattva-prātimokṣa Sutra, the Upāliparipṛcchā (also known in Chinese as The Buddha Speaks of Decisive Vinaya Sutra) and the Brahmajāla Sutra (or Brahmajāla Bodhisattva Śīla Sūtra). For East Asian Zen monastics, the Bequeathed Teachings Sutra is a widely chanted and studied text on ethical discipline.

Confession Sūtras 

The Sutra of the Three Heaps (Sanskrit: Triskandhadharmasutra) and the Golden Light Sutra (Suvarṇaprabhāsa-sūtra) focus on the practice of confession of faults. The Golden Light Sutra became especially influential in East Asian Buddhism, particularly because of its teaching on how the Four Heavenly Kings protect the ruler who governs his country in the proper manner and upholds the sutra.

The Sutra of the Three Heaps meanwhile remains an important confession focused sutra in Tibetan Buddhism.

Esoteric Sūtras and dhāraṇī 

Esoteric Sūtras comprise an important category of works that are related to magical and esoteric Buddhist practices. Many of these are often devoted to a particular mantra or dhāraṇī, or simply contain passages which teach these magical spells or chants. One of them, the Atanatiya Sutra, is also included in the mikkyo (esoteric) division of the standard modern collected edition of Sino-Japanese Buddhist literature.

Well-known esoteric sūtras or dhāraṇīs include:

 Uṣṇīṣa Vijaya Dhāraṇī Sūtra. 
 Nīlakaṇṭha Dhāraṇī.
 Cundī Dhāraṇī Sūtra.
 Eleven-Faced Avalokitesvara Heart Dharani Sūtra.
 Mahāpratisarā – mahāvidyārājñī.
 The Śūraṅgama Sūtra, which teaches the "Sitātapatra Uṣṇīṣa Dhāraṇī" (Ch. 大白傘蓋陀羅尼) and is included in the Taisho Tripitaka's Esoteric Sutra category.
 The Kāraṇḍavyūha Sūtra, known for teaching the famous mantra of Avalokiteśvara, "Om mani padme hum".
 Vajraśekhara Sūtra.
 Vairocanābhisaṃbodhi Sūtra.
 Sarvatathāgatatattva­saṃgraha Sūtra.
Sūtra of the Whole-Body Relic Treasure Chest Seal Dhāraṇī.
Pure Land Rebirth Dhāraṇī.

Some Prajñaparamita texts also include tantric and esoteric elements such as mantras. At least some editions of the Tibetan canon include the Heart Sutra in the tantra division.

Mahāyāna Sūtras of East Asian provenance 
There are various sūtras that were traditionally considered to be translations from Indian sources (and which are written to mimic Indic works) but that modern scholars have now shown were most likely composed in East Asia or Central Asia. These texts may also contain colophons which claim to be translations of an Indian original. These sutras are sometimes called "apocryphal" sūtras (a term borrowed from biblical studies) by modern scholars. In Buddhist studies, the term does not necessarily carry the pejorative connotations that it may have in other contexts (and these works are certainly not considered "heretical"). According to Charles Muller "while certain texts are fit to be classified with the "spurious" connotations of the term apocrypha, a significant portion of them were extremely well written works, whose contents accorded with the most profound of the Buddhist doctrines." East Asian Buddhists were aware of the phenomenon of writing original works and attributing them to Indian sources. These texts were sometimes classified either as i-ching (疑經 "scriptures of doubtful authenticity") or as wei-ching (僞教 "spurious scriptures"). Chinese Buddhists like Seng-yu (僧祐; 445-518) noted these spurious works in their Buddhist text catalogues.

Some Mahayana sutras in the Chinese canon which have been influential in East Asian Buddhism and are likely apocryphal include:
Amitāyurdhyāna Sūtra (佛說觀無量壽佛經, Guan-wuliangshou-jing, Sutra on the Visualization of [the Buddha] Immeasurable Life), an important sutra in Pure Land Buddhism, now considered by most scholars to be a Chinese (or possibly Central Asian) composition.
Brahma's Net Sutra (梵網經; Fànwǎng jīng), which according to Muller is now considered apocryphal by most scholars.
Blood Bowl Sutra (血盆經; Xuèpénjīng), of Chinese origin.
Vajrasamadhi Sūtra (金剛三昧經, Kŭmgang sammaegyŏng), traditionally seen as an Indian text, scholars have recently found that it was produced in Korea in about 685 CE.
 Innumerable Meanings Sutra (無量義經; pinyin: Wúliáng yì jīng).
Sutra of Perfect Enlightenment (圓覺經; pinyin: Yuánjué jīng).
Humane King Sutra (仁王經; rén wáng jīng).
The influential Śūraṅgama Sūtra is still a subject of debate. Some scholars, like Kogen Mizuno and Bernard Faure, consider it apocryphal, while others like Ronald Epstein disagree.

Since there are many apocryphal sutras in the Chinese Canon, modern scholars have developed various taxonomies of the different types of Apocryphal Sūtras. For example, according to Mochizuki Shinkō's Bukkyō kyōten seiritsushi ron, there are three main types of apocryphal Chinese "sutras". Makita Tairyō outlines five types of apocryphal sutras:

See also
 Buddhist texts
 Sutra
 Buddhist Tantras
 Tripitaka
 List of suttas
 Pali Canon
 Sanskrit Buddhist literature

Notes

Bibliography
 Dutt, Nalinaksha (1978). Buddhist Sects in India, Motilal Banararsidass, Delhi, 2nd Edition
 
 Kanno, Hiroshi (2003). Chinese Sutra Commentaries from the Early Period, Annual Report of The International Research Institute for Advanced Buddhology at Soka University, IRIAB, vol VI, 301-320
 Macmillan Encyclopedia of Buddhism, Macmillan, 2004.
 
 Nakamura, Hajime (1980). Indian Buddhism: A Survey with Bibliographical Notes. 1st edition: Japan, 1980. 1st Indian Edition: Delhi, 1987. 
 
 
 
 
 Pfand, Peter (1986). Māhāyana Texts Translated into Western Languages – A Bibliographical Guide. E.J. Brill, Köln, 
 
 
 Walser, Joseph. Genealogies of Mahāyāna Buddhism: Emptiness, Power and the question of Origin. Routledge.
 Walser, Joseph (2012), Nagarjuna in Context Mahayana Buddhism and Early Indian Culture. Columbia University Press.
 Warder, A. K. (1999). Indian Buddhism. Motilal Banarsidass, Delhi. 3rd revised edition
 Williams, Paul (2008). Mahayana Buddhism: The Doctrinal Foundations. Taylor & Francis

External links 
  	
Bingenheimer, Marcus (2014). Bibliography of Translations from the Chinese Buddhist Canon into Western Languages 
Buddhist Scriptures in Multiple Languages (Taisho Tripitaka)
Mahayana Canonical Text Titles and Translations in English
A Complete Buddhist Sutra Collection
Mahayana Sutras
Digital Sanskrit Buddhist Canon
Mahayana Buddhist Sutras in English
BuddhaNet's eBook Library (English pdfs)
Complete English translation and analysis of the Mahayana Mahaparinirvana Sutra or PDF
Bhadra-kalpika Sūtra Bhadra-kalpika Sutra {s = sahasra; l = laks Bhadra-kalpika Sutra, Manu-antara-s 3-4 Bhadra-kalpika Sutra, Manu-antara-s 5 & Bhadra-kalpika Sutra, Manu-antara-s 7 & 8
Sūtras
 

 
Mahayana texts